The following is a list of notable events and releases of the year 1907 in Norwegian music.

Events

Deaths

 September
 4 – Edvard Grieg (64), composer and pianist.
 5 – Adolf Østbye (39), revue artist, barber, and the first Norwegian recording artist.

 December
 1 – Agathe Backer Grøndahl (59), pianist and composer.

Births

See also
 1907 in Norway
 Music of Norway

References

 
Norwegian music
Norwegian
Music
1900s in Norwegian music